The final stages of the Sri Lankan Civil War created 300,000 internally displaced persons (IDPs) who were transferred to camps in Vavuniya District and detained there against their will. This process, together with conditions inside the camps and the slow progress of resettlement attracted much concern and criticism from inside and outside Sri Lanka. On 7 May 2009 the Sri Lankan government announced plans to resettle 80% of the IDPs by the end of 2009. After the end of the civil war Sri Lankan President Mahinda Rajapaksa gave assurances to foreign diplomats that the bulk of the IDPs would be resettled in accordance with the 180-day plan. On 1 December 2009, the IDPs were given limited freedom of movement. The pace of resettlement increased in 2010. The resettlement process was completed and camps were officially closed on 25 September 2012. However, the final batch of IDPs consisting of 110 families were relocated in Kepapilavu in Mullaitivu District-away from their original homes.

Although camps have been removed as of April 2015 as many as 13,459 families, accounting for 44,934 persons, were yet to be resettled and houses for them are still under construction

Background

The Liberation Tigers of Tamil Eelam (Tamil Tigers) had been waging a full-scale war for an independent state of Tamil Eelam in the North and East of Sri Lanka since 1983. After the failure of the Norwegian mediated peace process in 2006 the Sri Lankan Military launched military offensives aimed at recapturing the territory controlled by the Tamil Tigers. By July 2007 the military had recaptured all of the Eastern Province. The military offensive in the Northern Province escalated in October 2008 as the military attacked the Vanni heartland of the Tamil Tigers. After successive defeats, including the loss of their de facto capital Kilinochchi, the Tamil Tigers were forced to retreat east. The civilian population of the Vanni also fled east. It is disputed as to whether the civilians fled on their own accord or were forced to do so by the Tamil Tigers. By January 2009 the Tamil Tigers and the civilians were trapped in a small piece of land on the north-east coast in Mullaitivu District.

Safe Zone
As the Sri Lankan military advanced further into Tamil Tiger controlled areas, international concern grew for the fate of the 350,000 civilians trapped. The purpose of the Safe Zone was ostensibly to allow the trapped civilians to cross into territory controlled by the Sri Lankan military. However, very few civilians actually crossed into the military territory. Again, the reason for this is disputed. The Sri Lankan military, UN and human rights organisations accused the Tamil Tigers of preventing the civilians from leaving.

The fighting between the military and the Tamil Tigers continued, causing the civilians to flee from the Safe Zone to a narrow strip of land between Nanthi Kadal lagoon and the Indian Ocean. On 12 February 2009 the military declared a new  Safe Zone in this area, north-west of Mullaitivu town. Over the next three months a brutal siege of the Safe Zone occurred as the military allegedly blitzed by land and air the last remnants of Tamil Tigers trapped in the Safe Zone. Satellite images of the Safe Zone publishes by the UN, foreign governments and scientific organisations showed heavy damage that could have only been caused by bombardment. Inevitably many thousands of civilians were killed or injured. The UN, based on credible witness evidence from aid agencies as well civilians evacuated from the Safe Zone by sea, estimated that 6,500 civilians were killed and another 14,000 injured between mid-January, when the Safe Zone was first declared, and mid-April. There are no official casualty figures after this period but estimates of the death toll for the final four months of the civil war (mid-January to mid-May) range from 15,000 to 20,000. A US State Department report has suggested that the actual casualty figures were probably much higher than the UN's estimates and that significant numbers of casualties weren't recorded. As the civil war edged towards a bitter end in late April/early May the number of civilians leaving the Safe Zone turned from a trickle to a torrent. On 19 May the Sri Lankan government declared victory.

IDP camps
All civilians who managed to escape the fighting in the Safe Zone and the civilians who were still in the Safe Zone after the end of combat were taken by the Sri Lankan military to southern Vavuniya District and housed in camps, mostly schools. The IDPs weren’t allowed to leave the camps. The reasons given by the Sri Lankan government/military for not allowing the civilians to return to their homes were the existence of land mines and the need to identify Tamil Tigers whom they allege are hiding amongst the civilians.

Terminology
The Sri Lankan government/military describes the camps as "welfare centres" or "welfare villages" but the conditions imposed on the IDPs have prompted others, inside and outside Sri Lanka, to use other terms to describe the camps.

Western critics have described the camps as "prisons" or "closed camps" because the IDPs were not permitted to leave the camps.

Some, including the United Nations’ High Commissioner for Human Rights Navanethem Pillay, have gone further and described the camps as "internment camps" because the IDPs were not permitted leave the camps; access to the camps by independent aid organisations, independent media, IDPs relatives and opposition politicians is heavily restricted or denied completely; and the camps are controlled by the Sri Lankan military.

Tamil activists have described the camps as "concentration camps", using an image of IDPs standing behind barbed wire fences to liken the camps to the concentration camps of World War II and Bosnian Civil War. Indian and Tamil MPs, Catholic priests, academics and the Permanent Peoples' Tribunal based in Milan, have also referred to the IDP camps as concentration camps. Booker Prize-winning author Arundhati Roy and Noam Chomsky are other prominent political activists who have used described the IDP camps as concentration camps. Writers for the British newspapers, The Telegraph and The Times have also used the term concentration camps.

Criticism and concern about the camps

The conditions imposed on the IDPs, the conditions inside the camps and the slow progress of resettlement have attracted widespread criticism from inside and outside Sri Lanka.

Detention
The IDPs were not allowed to leave the camps initially. Human rights groups believe that this effectively meant that the IDPs were being detained indefinitely without charge or trial, in contravention of international law. Articles 9 and 12 of the International Covenant on Civil and Political Rights, to which Sri Lanka is party, guarantee the rights to liberty, freedom from arbitrary detention and freedom of movement.

On 1 December 2009 the camps were opened up, giving the IDPs limited freedom. The IDPs could leave the camps for up to 15 days after giving their details to the authorities but they would have to return to the camps on a stipulated day. Some IDPs could leave the camps permanently but would have to report to the police regularly. The Sri Lankan military has threatened to "track down" IDPs who don't return to camps or report to the police. The camps are being described by some as "open prisons" because of these strict conditions imposed on the IDPs. The UN has given a cautious welcome to the opening up of the camps but reiterated its expectations that all of the IDPs should be returned to their homes permanently by 31 January 2010. Some observers believe the opening up is an election ploy ahead of the presidential elections which are due to be held on 26 January 2010.

Access
Initially the Sri Lankan military denied all access to the camps by NGOs. This was later relaxed after pressure was exerted by the international community. Many local and international NGOs now work in the camps but they continue to report problems with access. However, human rights groups and others who wish provide advice to the IDPs are still denied access.

Access to the camps by independent media is heavily restricted. When the media are allowed into the camps they are monitored by the military and all contact with the IDPs is filmed by the military.

Access to the camps by the IDPs' relatives is also heavily restricted.

Access to the camps by opposition politicians has been denied completely. However, politicians from the ruling United People's Freedom Alliance regularly visit the camps and meet the IDPs. On most occasions when any IDPs are released or returned to their places of origin they are photographed with government ministers, particularly the paramilitary leader Douglas Devananda.

Poor preparation
In September 2008 the Sri Lankan government ordered all NGOs out of the Vanni which meant that they weren’t on location to provide assistance when the IDPs were transferred from the Safe Zone to the camps.

During the siege of the Safe Zone the Sri Lankan government/military consistently understated the number of civilians trapped in the Safe Zone which meant the NGOs weren’t prepared for the influx of 300,000 IDPs into the camps.

Flooding
The Menik Farm site is very prone to flooding because it lies on low ground near a number of rivers and streams including the Aruvi Aru (Malvathu Oya). In August heavy rains flooded the site, causing heavy damage to the tents housing the IDPs and sending raw sewage into the camps and the rivers providing drinking water. There is widespread concern that the north east monsoon season (October to March) will flood the site.

IDPs identified as Tamil Tigers
By the end of September 10,000 IDPs had been identified as having some links to the Tamil Tigers. This includes not only former cadres but also their relatives, those who worked in the Tigers’s civil administrative structures and anyone believed to be a supporter or sympathizer of the Tigers. They have been moved to separate camps. The conditions imposed on them are even harsher because the Red Cross and UN have been denied access to them. Many of those being detained as Tamil Tigers are children, whom the UN has called on the Sri Lankan government to be released. In June 2011, government claimed that all former female LTTE combatants were released.

The camps
The IDPs were initially held at numerous small camps, mostly schools (Maha Vidyalayam), located throughout southern Vavuniya District. Since then most of these small camps have been closed and IDPs instead concentrated at the Menik Farm site.

Menik Farm is located in the far south-west of Vavuniya District near the district’s border with Anuradhapura and Mannar districts. The site straddles the A14 Mannar-Medawachchiya road and the disused Mannar railway line. The site is very close to the Aruvi Aru and other rivers and streams. One of the Aruvi Aru’s tributaries actually cuts the site into two. With a population in excess of 200,000 Menik Farm is believed to be the largest IDP camp in the world. It has also become one of Sri Lanka’s largest settlements.

The following camps/hospitals are being or have been used to house the IDPs displaced from the Vanni region since October 2008:

Vavuniya District

Vengalachedikulam Divisional Secretary’s Division

Menik Farm Zone 0 (Kathirkamar Village)
Menik Farm Zone 1 (Ananda Kumarasamy Village)
Menik Farm Zone 2 (Pon Ramanathan Village) (closed 24 November 2010, IDPs moved to Menik Farm Zones 0 and 1)
Menik Farm Zone 3 (Arunachchalam Village)
Menik Farm Zone 4 (closed 9 November 2010, IDPs moved to Menik Farm Zones 0 and 1)
Menik Farm Zone 5 (closed February 2010)
Menik Farm Zone 6
Menik Farm Zone 7 (Maruthamadu Welfare Centre)
Andiyapuliyankulam School (closed early May, IDPs moved to Menik Farm Zone 2; closed early September 2009, IDPs moved to Menik Farm Zone 6)
Ariviththodam Sivanantha Vidyalayam, Menik Farm (closed early September 2009, IDPs moved to Menik Farm Zone 6)
Cheddikulam Base Hospital
Cheddikulam Maha Vidyalayam (closed early September 2009, IDPs moved to Menik Farm Zone 6)
Muthaliyankulam Maha Vidyalayam (closed early May 2009, IDPs moved to Menik Farm Zone 2)
Sooduventhapualvu Muslim School (closed early September 2009, IDPs moved to Menik Farm Zone 6)
Sumathipuram Welfare Centre, Ulunkkulam (on border with Anuradhapura district)
Tharmapuram Welfare Centre (Mahakongaskada (MKK)) (on border with Anuradhapura district) (closed February 2010, IDPs moved to Menik Farm Zones 3 and 1)
Veerapuram Maha Vidyalayam

Vavuniya Divisional Secretary’s Division
Gamini Maha Vidyalayam (closed late June 2009, IDPs moved to Sumathipuram WC)
Kanthapuram Maha Vidyalayam (Scandapuram) (closed late June 2009, IDPs moved to Sumathipuram WC)
Komarasankulam Maha Vidyalayam
Kovilkulam Hindu College
Nelukkulam Kalaimagal Maha Vidyalayam (closed early September 2009, IDPs moved to Menik Farm Zone 6)
Nelukkulam Technical College
Omanthai Maha Vidyalayam
Pampaimadu Hospital
Pampamadhu Hostel School (closed 27 May 2009, IDPs moved to Menik Farm Zone 4)
Ponthoodam Government Tamil Mixed School (closed 27 May 2009, IDPs moved to Menik Farm Zone 4)
Poonathoddam College of Education (closed April 2010)
Poovarankulam Base Hospital
Poovarasankulam Maha Vidyalayam (closed early May 2009, IDPs moved to Menik Farm Zone 2)
Puthukkulam Maha Vidyalayam
Rambakulam Ladies College (closed early May 2009, IDPs moved to Menik Farm Zone 2)
Samanankulam School
Saivapragasa Ladies' College
Thandikulam Maha Vidyalayam
Vavuniya General Hospital
Vavuniya Muslim Maha Vidyalayam
Vavuniya Tamil Maha Vidyalayam (Primary) (closed 27 May 2009, IDPs moved to Menik Farm Zone 4)
Vavuniya Tamil Madhya Maha Vidyalayam (Senior) (closed late June 2009, IDPs moved to Sumathipuram WC)
Velikkulam School

Jaffna District
Chavakachcheri Hindu College (closed late May 2009, IDPs moved to Kodikamam Ramavil)
Chavakachcheri Hindu Ladies College (closed early June 2009, IDPs moved to Kodikamam Ramavil)
Kaithady Ayurvedic University Hostel
Kaithady Palmyra Research Institute 1
Kaithady Palmyra Research Institute 2
Kaithady Hindu Children Home
Kodikamam Government Tamil Mixed School
Kodikamam Ramavil (Kodikamam Forest)
Kodikamam Thirunavitkarasu Maha Vidyalayam (closed late May 2009, IDPs moved to Kodikamam Ramavil)
Kopay Teacher Training College
Manalkadu
Murusivil Roman Catholic Tamil Mixed School
Nelliyady Central College (closed early June 2009, IDPs moved to Kodikamam Ramavil)
Thirunagar Old Court House

Mannar District
English Training Centre
Illupaikkulam (closed March 2010, IDPs moved to Kalimoddai)
Kalimoddai
Mannar District General Hospital
Mannar Welfare Centre
Sirukandal (closed March 2010, IDPs moved to Kalimoddai)

Trincomalee District
Arafat Nagar Muslim Maha Vidyalam
Kantale Base Hospital
Methodist School
Pulmoddai Field Hospital
Pulmoddai Muslim Maha Vidyalayam
Pulmoddai Sinhala Maha Vidyalayam
Sahanagama Welfare Centre Site 1, Pulmoddai (13th Mile post)
Sahanagama Welfare Centre Site 2, Pulmoddai (13th Mile post)
Thampalakamam Peripheral Unit
Trincomalee General Hospital

A number of hospitals in other districts have also been used by the IDPs.

Release/return to places of origin

When the camps were initially established in early 2009 the Sri Lankan government stated that it expected to hold the IDPs in the camps for as long as three years. However, on 7 May 2009 the Sri Lankan government announced plans to resettle 80% of the IDPs by the end of 2009. This was reinforced on 21 May 2009 when President Rajapaksa gave assurances that most of the civilians would be resettled within 180 days.

By July the resettlement target was being revised downwards. On 10 July President Rajapaksa stated that there was target, not a promise, to resettle 50-60% of the IDPs by the end of November 2009. However, on 16 July 2009 in a letter of intent to the International Monetary Fund (IMF) the Sri Lankan government stated that it aimed to resettle 70-80% of the IDPs by the end of 2009. The IMF subsequently approved a US$2.6 billion loan to Sri Lanka.

By the end of August 2009 less than 12,000 IDPs (5%) had been released or returned to their places of origin. The imminent monsoon raised concern amongst the aid agencies/international community. The Sri Lankan government reacted to this by returning more IDPs to their places of origin. Some of these IDPs were held in military run "closed" transit sites in their home districts, from which they can’t leave and access by aid agencies is heavily restricted. Some IDPs were allowed to return to their homes but most of these homes are located inside high security zones, such as the Jaffna islands, which are under the strict control of Sri Lankan Navy. The Sri Lankan military places heavy restrictions on civilians living inside these areas and on access to them from outside.

By early October the resettlement target had been reduced even further. On 6 October 2009 a Sri Lanka's Deputy Finance Minister Sarath Amunugama issued a statement saying the government hoped to resettle 100,000 (35%) of the IDPs by the end of 2009. In late October the government accelerated the resettlement programme by returning IDPs to areas formerly controlled by the Tamil Tigers in Kilinochchi, Mannar and Mullaitivu districts. On 22 October 2009 the Sri Lankan government claimed to have released of 41,685 IDPs (16,394 from Mullaitivu District, 10,017 from Kilinochchi District, 8,643 from Vavuniya District and 6,631 from Mannar District), which was widely reported in the media. However, other reports suggested that only 5,700 IDPs had been released, with another 36,000 to be resettled over the "coming weeks". This was later confirmed by UN figures which showed that only 25,474 IDPs had been released/returned to places of origin between 10 and 23 October. Of those who were actually released some were returned to the IDP camps after the end of the photo-opportunity for government ministers, whilst others were taken to transit camps in their home districts, not their homes. The apparent fast pace of resettlement in October 2009 and early November 2009 was due to IDP's being returned to areas that have been under government control for many years (Jaffna, Mannar and Vavuniya). Most of the IDPs in the camps from these areas had been returned to their places of origin by November. The pace of resettlement in areas controlled by the Tamil Tigers (Kilinochchi and Mullaitivu) has been very slow, particularly in areas east of the A 9 highway. Consequently, the pace of resettlement had slowed down by late November. On 29 December 2009 the Sri Lankan government stated that there was no deadline for the resettlement of the IDPs, contradicting previous assurances.

The pace of resettlement increased in 2010. The camps were officially closed on 25 September 2012.

Cumulative numbers of IDPs displaced from the Vanni since October 2008 who have been released or returned to places of origin from IDP camps:

1 Figures are the latest available on date.
2 Since 5 August 2009.

Number remaining at camps

Numbers of IDPs displaced from the Vanni since October 2008 who continue to reside at the camps:

1 Figures are the latest available on date.

References

External links
 UN Office for the Coordination of Humanitarian Affairs, Sri Lanka
 Humanitarian Portal, Sri Lanka
 ReliefWeb, Sri Lanka
 Unlock the Camps
 Ministry of Resettlement of Disaster Relief Services, Sri Lanka

Aftermath of the Sri Lankan Civil War
Buildings and structures of the Sri Lankan Civil War
 
Sri Lankan Civil War
 
Internally displaced persons